Donald Michael Kraig (March 28, 1951 – March 17, 2014) was an American occult author and practitioner of ceremonial magic. Kraig published six books, including his 1988 introduction to ceremonial magic, Modern Magick. He was also an editor for Fate Magazine and for his main publisher Llewellyn Worldwide.

Early life
Kraig graduated from UCLA with a degree in philosophy and studied public speaking and music at other colleges and universities. He was initiated into Aridian Witchcraft by author Raven Grimassi, and into American Traditionalist Witchcraft by Scott Cunningham.

Career
After a decade of personal study and practice of the occult, he taught courses in Southern California and at Neo-Pagan festivals and events on topics including Kabbalah, Tarot, Magick, the Lovecraft Mythos, Psychic Development and Tantra, and was an initiated Tantric who ran a lodge of AMOOKOS, an east-west tantric occult group.

Kraig was a member of several spiritual and magical groups. He was a professional musician, as an organist, synthesist, keyboard player, theremin player, and singer. He taught computer skills at the University of Southern California, and was a member of Hollywood's magician club The Magic Castle. He was awarded the honor of Certified Tarot Grand Master by the Associated Readers of Tarot. He was an editor of Fate Magazine. Kraig signed to Llewellyn Publications (now Llewellyn Worldwide), publisher or co-publisher of his main books, articles, and tapes; he was editor for The Llewellyn Journal in 2001 and for Llewellyn's New Worlds in 2003.

Hypnotherapist
He received training and certification as a clinical hypnotherapist by the American Board of Hypnotherapy (ABH), the National Guild of Hypnotists (NGH), and the Association for Integrative Psychology (AIP). He was also certified as a hypnosis instructor by the ABH and as a master practitioner of Neuro-Linguistic Programming (NLP) by the AIP.

Media appearances
Kraig was a guest on Coast to Coast AM with George Noory, Personal Life Media, The Deviant Minds Salon, Pagans Tonight! on BlogTalk Radio, Right Where You Are Sitting Now, and Occultists Radio.

Death
Kraig died March 17, 2014, after battling pancreatic cancer.

Bibliography
Published works include:

Books
 1988 Modern Magick: Eleven Lessons in the High Magickal Arts. Llewellyn Publications.  (2nd edition: 2002) (republished in 2010 re-subtitled: 12 Lessons in the High Magickal Arts.)
 1990 Magical Diary. Llewellyn Publications. 
 1994 The Truth About Evocation of Spirits. Llewellyn Publications. 
 1998 Modern Sex Magick: Secrets of Erotic Spirituality. Llewellyn Publications. 
 1999 The Truth About Psychic Powers. Llewellyn Publications. 
 2002 Tarot and Magic. Llewellyn Publications. 
 2006 Graeco-Egyptian Magick by Tony Mierzwicki, preface by Donald Michael Kraig. Megalithica Books , 
 2006 The Encyclopedia of Magic and Alchemy by Rosemary Ellen Guiley, foreword by Donald Michael Kraig, Checkmark Books , 
 2009 The Resurrection Murders. Galde Press , 
 2015 Modern Tantra. Llewellyn Publications.

Articles
In Llewellyn Publications' New Worlds:
"The World of Magick" in New Worlds #23 
"The World of Magick" in New Worlds #34 
"Advanced Magick" in New Worlds #43 
"Magick and Kindergarten" in New Worlds #44 
"All Magick Is Sex Magick" in New Worlds #51 
In Llewellyn Publications' The Llewellyn Journal:
"Discovering My Ancestors" in The Llewellyn Journal, December 2001 
"Psychic Attack—First Defense" in The Llewellyn Journal, August 2002 
In Ecstasy Through Tantra by Jonn Mumford
"A Tantric Weekend"

Discography
 Using Modern Magick (companion tape to the book). ACE/Llewellyn Collection, 1988.
 The Golden Dawn: Its History & Its Magick - (lecture tape) ACE
 The Secret of Magickal Evocation - (lecture tape) ACE
 Tantra for the Layperson (lecture tape) ACE
 Tantra without Tears (lecture tape) ACE
 Kabbalistic Numerology (lecture tape) ACE
 Kabbalistic Meditation (lecture tape) ACE
 The Self in Transformation with Halim El-Dabh, Donald Michael Kraig, Jeff Rosenbaum, Joseph Rothenberg and Robert Anton Wilson (Panel Discussion) ACE
 Initiation and Initiatory Orders with Rev. Paul Beyerl, Ian Corrigan Donald Michael Kraig and Liafal (Panel Discussion) ACE

References

1951 births
2014 deaths
American occult writers